Áras Contae an Chláir is a municipal building in Ennis, County Clare, Ireland.

History
Originally meetings of Clare County Council were held at Ennis Courthouse. The new county building, which was designed by Henry J Lyons & Partners, was completed in May 2008. It was commended in the public buildings category in the Irish Architecture Awards held by the Royal Institute of the Architects of Ireland in 2008. The council meeting room was upgraded in 2018 when new fixtures and fittings, including 22 chairs and a 7-metre bespoke table featuring the council coat of arms, were acquired at a cost of €51,000.

References

Buildings and structures in County Clare
Clare